Salomey was the Yokums' beloved pet pig in the classic comic strip Li'l Abner, by cartoonist Al Capp.  Salomey, whose name was a pun on both salami and Salome, was supposedly the last female Hammus alabammus—an adorable species of pig, which led to a number of story arcs.  Cute, lovable, and intelligent (arguably smarter than the male Yokums, Li'l Abner and Pappy), she was accepted as part of the family.  

One story from 1942 concerned the kidnapping of Salomey by "the world's greatest sportsman hogbreeder" J. R. Fangsley, who wanted to breed her with the last male Hammus alabammus, "Boar Scarloff" (a pun on actor Boris Karloff). In 1947 Salomey was again kidnapped, this time by Bounder J. Roundheels, who wanted to use Salomey to create a unique dish that would gain him entrance into an exclusive Gourmets' Club. And in "Porknoy's Complaint" (1969), pork tycoon J. Roaringham Fatback desired her for his favorite dish—pork and beans "Buckingham Palace style". 

In the 1960s, Salomey traveled to "Boarkley" (Berkeley) to undergo her "boar mitzvah." There she encountered Capp's burlesque of the youth movement: S.W.I.N.E. (Students Wildly Indignant about Nearly Everything) was a parody of student movements, specifically the S.D.S. (Students for a Democratic Society).  Capp, who lived right outside Harvard in Cambridge, Massachusetts, received criticism from the Left.

Footnotes

Li'l Abner characters
Characters created by Al Capp
Comics characters introduced in 1934
Fictional pigs
Male characters in comics